Jane Grace Isoken Omorogbe (born 20 September 1971) is a British model and actress, perhaps best known as Rio on ITVs Gladiators; she is a TV presenter and motorcycling journalist.

Early life
Omorogbe was born in Newcastle upon Tyne but her family moved to Hastings, East Sussex, when she was five. After leaving school (Claverham Community College, Battle) Omorogbe was an ambulance driver and has a certificate in advanced first aid. Her parents are Nigerian immigrants.

Modelling
Omorogbe modelled bridal gowns for Geddes-Muir Designs, and was signed by Martin Enterprises - Studio 17 modelling agency in 1994. In 1995 Omorogbe entered the Miss Wessex beauty contest. She won the title of Miss Wessex and was entered into the Miss United Kingdom final, although she didn't win the title. In 1996 she was in the top 6 of the "Babe of '96".

Television career

Omorogbe appeared in The Sun as a finalist in Miss United Kingdom, where she was spotted by Gladiators referee John Anderson, and was asked to audition. She was not considered fit/strong enough, so she quit her ambulance job and left Hastings to train with a Taekwando expert, in order to pass the rigorous fitness test required by LWT. After five months of training, Omorogbe passed the tests to become Gladiator Rio.

After taking part in six series of Gladiators from 1996 until 2000, she turned her love of motorbikes into a career. She presented numerous shows in quick succession to gain experience, including Car Crazy Rio, Top Bikes, Two Wheels, Revved Up, Teen Trials, Top Gear GTi, Pit Stop Bikes, Pulling Power and Fran's Angels.

Like Suzi Perry and Fran Robinson before her, she was the pit-side reporter for Live Speedway on Sky Sports. She is the Grid and Pitside Reporter for ITV’s British Touring Car Championship coverage, having covered British Superbike Championship for them.

She has also presented House Race for ITV with Mike Brewer, and was an auctioneer on Bid tv.

Writing
Omorogbe is the main motorbike reporter for The Sun and The Times newspapers. She writes motorbike reviews for the Press Association. These reviews are published by a variety of publications, including the motorbike section of MSN Cars.

References

External links

Bio at her agents website

1971 births
Living people
Actresses from Newcastle upon Tyne
English beauty pageant winners
English television presenters
English journalists
Gladiators (1992 British TV series)
Motorcycle journalists
Black British fashion people
English people of Nigerian descent